Şıxheybət (also, Shikheybat, Shikheybet, and Shykheybat) is a village in the Tovuz Rayon of Azerbaijan.  The village forms part of the municipality of Çatax.

References 

Populated places in Tovuz District